Osedax is a genus of deep-sea siboglinid polychaetes, commonly called boneworms, zombie worms, or bone-eating worms. Osedax is Latin for "bone-eater".  The name alludes to how the worms bore into the bones of whale carcasses to reach enclosed lipids, on which they rely for sustenance. They utilize specialized root tissues for bone-boring. It is possible that multiple species of Osedax reside in the same bone. Osedax worms are also known to feed on the collagen itself by making holes in the whale's skeletal structure. These holes can also serve as a form of protection from nearby predators.

Scientists from the Monterey Bay Aquarium Research Institute using the submarine ROV Tiburon first discovered the genus in Monterey Bay, California, in February 2002.

Anatomy and physiology
Lacking stomach and mouth, Osedax rely on symbiotic species of bacteria that aid in the digestion of whale proteins and lipids and release nutrients that the worms can absorb. Osedax have colorful feathery plumes that act as gills and unusual root-like structures that absorb nutrients. The Osedax secrete acid (rather than rely on teeth) to bore into bone to access the nutrients. High concentrations of carbonic anhydrase are found in the roots of Osedax. This serves as evidence of a common bioerosion mechanism in which secreted acid is produced by anaerobic respiration. This process works with a demineralization mechanism in which oxygen is carried from seawater to the roots and HCO3- is secreted into the seawater. Between 50 and 100 microscopic dwarf males live inside the tube surrounding a single female and never develop past the larval stage.

Through the use of X-ray CT technology, scans showed that borings made by Osedax mucofloris were hemi-ellipsoidal in shape, flat at the top, and a bit rounded at the deepest point within the bone. The borings’ surface area to volume ratio decreases as the borings become larger due to the hemi-ellipsoidal shape. Boring depths varied depending on which specific bone was colonized by the O. mucofloris. Higher boring depths were found in radius bone compared to the ulna and vertebrae.

Osedax worms have different regions such as a trunk region, ovisac region, and root region. The epidermis also plays key roles in bone deterioration and nutrient uptake. This process of bone deterioration occurs through a symbiotic relationship with an endosymbiotic bacteria. The cells in the epidermis of the Osedax root region are responsible for the secretion of digestive enzymes. The epidermis also has an expanded microvillus border which causes the Osedax worm to have a greater surface area.

Osedax roots are covered by a mucus sheath that helps protect the worm's trunk. Some studies support the theory that this sheath plays a role in dissolving the bone. This sheath could also play an important role in reducing the damage to Osedax skin by absorbing harmful acid. Another potential function of the mucus sheath is that it could inhibit the breakdown of the worm's bone matrix. This is significant because the bone matrix is integral in maintaining the worm's position while in direct contact with a bone.

Reproduction
Female Osedax worms have been observed spawning both in the wild and in laboratory aquaria (Rouse et al., 2009). Osedax rubiplumus can spawn hundreds of oocytes at a time. They are already fertilized when they're released from the female worm. The worms' endosymbionts, species of bacteria in the order Oceanospirillales, were not observed in the spawned oocytes, which suggests that they are acquired after the worms settle on the bones. In the adult, the bacteria are localised in the root-like structures that grow into the whale bone. This worm appears to be highly fecund and reproduces continuously. This may help explain why Osedax is such a diverse genus, despite the rarity of whale falls in the ocean.

Male Osedax are microscopic dwarfs that live as "harems" inside the lumen of the gelatinous tube that surrounds each female. An individual female can house hundreds of these males in her tube.

Following its discovery in 2002 by researchers at the Monterey Bay Aquarium Research Institute, the genus was announced in Science in 2004.

In late 2005, an experiment by Swedish marine biologists resulted in the discovery of a species of the worm in the North Sea off the west coast of Sweden. Biologists were surprised to find that, unlike the previous discoveries, the new species, colloquially known as "bone-eating snot flower" after its scientific name (Osedax mucofloris), lived in relatively shallow waters.

In November 2009, researchers reported finding as many as 15 species of boneworms living in Monterey Bay on the California coast.

Niche

The role of Osedax in the degradation of marine vertebrate remains controversial. Some scientists think that Osedax is a specialist on whalebones while others think that it is more of a generalist. This controversy is due to a biogeographic paradox: despite the rarity and ephemeral nature of whale falls, Osedax has a broad biogeographic range and is surprisingly diverse. One hypothesis advanced to explain this paradox is that Osedax are able to colonize a variety of vertebrate remains besides whalebones. This hypothesis is supported by an experiment involving cow bones suspended above the sea floor. A variety of Osedax species successfully colonized these bones. Osedax have also been observed colonizing terrestrial mammal bones mixed in with galley waste from a surface vessel. Other scientists have countered this hypothesis by pointing out how the cow bone experiment does not match any natural habitat and also the low probability of terrestrial mammal bones arriving at the ocean floor in significant quantities. They also point out other cases of food falls in which the remains disappeared too swiftly for Osedax colonization and the lack of any observed colonization in similar cases. The true role of Osedax in the degradation of marine vertebrate remains is important to marine vertebrate taphonomy. Burrows closely similar to those made by Osedax species have been found in the bones of ancient marine birds and plesiosaurs, suggesting that the genus may once have had a wider range of foods. In a study of the boring morphological diversity of Osedax, it was shown that the species difference of bone-boring is highly variable; within the same species, the boring morphology is only consistent in a particular bone, but not consistent in different bones. It was also suggested that multiple species of Osedax can co-exist in the same bone and in an incomplete spatial niche differentiation.

The function of Osedax and their borings welcome other species such as Stephonyx amphipods, Paralomis crabs, and Rubyspira gastropods. As Osedax worms break down bone and lipid layers, fauna take advantage and colonize these bone matrices. Overall, the borings made by Osedax have shown to enhance biodiversity and the worms should, therefore, be considered ecosystem engineers. The downside of the deterioration caused by Osedax is that it speeds up the process of erosion, therefore only allowing this new fauna their new habitats for a temporary period.

Evolution 
The oldest trace fossils on bones characteristic of Osedax are from a plesiosaur humerus from the Cambridge Greensand, England, likely reworked from late Albian (~100 million years old) sediments and a rib and costal plate from a sea turtle found in Cenomanian (100-93 million years ago) aged sediments of the Chalk Group, England. Osedax likely persisted on the bones of sea turtles after the extinction of most large marine reptiles at the end of the Cretaceous. Osedax have the generalist ability to feed on different vertebrates (fishes, marine birds, whale bones).

In terms of evolutionary history research, the Osedax could have had negative impact in preserving fossil record because its appearance at the shelf-depth combined with its ability to efficiently break down marine vertebrates skeletons.

Species

Selected species:
 Osedax antarcticus Glover, Wiklund & Dahlgren, 2013
 Osedax braziliensis Fujiwara, Jimi, Sumida, Kawato, Kitazato
 Osedax bryani Rouse, Goffredi, Johnson & Vrijenhoek
 Osedax crouchi Amon, Wiklund, Dahlgren, Copley, Smith, Jamieson & Glover, 2014
 Osedax deceptionensis Taboada, Cristobo, Avila, Wiklund & Glover, 2013
 Osedax docricketts Rouse, Goffredi, Johnson & Vrijenhoek
 Osedax frankpressi Rouse, Goffredi & Vrijenhoek, 2004
 Osedax jabba Rouse, Goffredi, Johnson & Vrijenhoek
 Osedax japonicus Fujikura, Fujiwara & Kawato, 2006
 Osedax knutei Rouse, Goffredi, Johnson & Vrijenhoek
 Osedax lehmani Rouse, Goffredi, Johnson & Vrijenhoek
 Osedax lonnyi Rouse, Goffredi, Johnson & Vrijenhoek
 Osedax mucofloris Glover, Kallstrom, Smith & Dahlgren, 2005
 Osedax nordenskjoeldi Amon, Wiklund, Dahlgren, Copley, Smith, Jamieson & Glover, 2014
 Osedax priapus Rouse et al., 2014
 Osedax packardorum Rouse, Goffredi, Johnson & Vrijenhoek
 Osedax randyi Rouse, Goffredi, Johnson & Vrijenhoek
 Osedax rogersi Amon, Wiklund, Dahlgren, Copley, Smith, Jamieson & Glover, 2014
 Osedax roseus Rouse, Worsaae, Johnson, Jones & Vrijenhoek, 2008
 Osedax rubiplumus Rouse, Goffredi & Vrijenhoek, 2004
 Osedax ryderi Rouse, Goffredi, Johnson & Vrijenhoek
 Osedax sigridae Rouse, Goffredi, Johnson & Vrijenhoek
 Osedax talkovici Rouse, Goffredi, Johnson & Vrijenhoek
 Osedax tiburon Rouse, Goffredi, Johnson & Vrijenhoek
 Osedax ventana Rouse, Goffredi, Johnson & Vrijenhoek
 Osedax westernflyer Rouse, Goffredi, Johnson & Vrijenhoek

References

Further reading

External links 

 Press release describing discovery of Osedax
 BBC website – link to story about discovery of Osedax worms in the North Sea
 A Motley Collection of Boneworms – Monterey Bay Aquarium Research Institute
 Discovered in the deep: the worm that eats bones – The Guardian

Sabellida